Forrest Films is an American film production, financing, and distribution company. It was formed in 2018 and is headquartered in Burbank, California, on the Warner Bros lot.

History
Forrest Films was founded in December 2018 by Lucas Oil founder Forrest Lucas and race car driver-actor-producer Ali Afshar, with Afshar as CEO. The company aims to make inspirational and hopeful family films. ESX Productions, a film production and financing company formed in 2015 by Lucas and Afshar, operates as a label under the Forrest Films banner. Scott Kennedy, formerly head of operations and distribution for Open Road Films, was named president of worldwide marketing and distribution. In February 2019, Christina Moore, a former Mad TV cast member, was named vice president of development and production; Ava Rettke was named director of development and production; and Forrest Films signed a three-film deal with producer Hadeel Reda.

Prior to the formation of Forrest Films, Lucas and Afshar produced several films through ESX: The Dog Lover, starring Lea Thompson;  Running Wild, starring Sharon Stone; American Wrestler: The Wizard, based on Afshar's time as a high school wrestler; Pray for Rain, starring Jane Seymour; and Dirt, starring DeRon Horton.

The first Forrest Films production, Bennett's War, starring Michael Roark and Trace Adkins, was released in theaters in the United States on August 30, 2019. Later in 2019, Forrest Films will release the drama film The Ride, starring Shane Graham and Ludacris and based on the life of BMX racer John Buultjens. The company plans to release seven films by 2021. Each will have a budget of $5 million or less. 

In July 2019, it was announced that Forrest Films would produce the mixed martial arts film Mickey Kelley, starring Sean Patrick Flanery, Katrina Bowden, and Dennis Quaid, written by Flanery and Alex Ranarivelo, and directed by Ranarivelo. It will also feature MMA fighters Renzo Gracie, Edson Barboza, and Mickey Gall. Other planned upcoming releases include romantic drama Roped, sports drama Lady Driver, thriller The Stand at Paxton County, and comedy Wheels of Fortune.

Films

References

External links 
 Official website

American film studios
Film production companies of the United States
Film distributors of the United States
Entertainment companies based in California
Entertainment companies established in 2018
2018 establishments in California
Companies based in Burbank, California